James Wilson Mackay (born 20 July 1984) is an Australian actor known for The CW television series Dynasty, as well as roles in films and on stage.

Early life
Mackay attended Sydney Grammar School in Sydney, Australia, where he first started acting in school plays.

Mackay studied at the University of Sydney, graduating with a Bachelor of Arts in history and English literature, before training as an actor at the Western Australian Academy of Performing Arts in Perth.

He is the son of Hugh Mackay.

Career

Stage
In 2013 Mackay played Irwin in the Alan Bennett play The History Boys at the Sydney Opera House, alongside John Wood, Heather Mitchell and Paul Goddard. In 2012 he performed with the Sydney Theatre Company as Danceny in Les Liaisons Dangereuses, with Hugo Weaving and Pamela Rabe.

Mackay was an artistic associate of independent theatre company Cry Havoc. He worked on two shows with the company, William Shakespeare’s Julius Caesar in 2009 (playing Marc Antony), and Anton Chekhov’s Three Sisters in 2010 (playing Andrey), for which he also collaborated on an original music score.

In 2021, he starred as Orlando in the Melbourne Theatre Company's production of As You Like It.

Film and television 
Mackay appeared as William Beaumont in the 2015 Australian film The Dressmaker  with Kate Winslet, Sarah Snook, Judy Davis, Liam Hemsworth and Hugo Weaving.

Other credits include Don't Be Afraid of the Dark, starring Katie Holmes and Guy Pearce, and The Lovers, directed by Palme d'Or winner and Oscar nominee Roland Joffé. Mackay also played roles in the 2012 horror-thriller Redd Inc (released as Inhuman Resources in the US), Matchbox Pictures’ series The Straits, a crime drama filmed in Cairns and the Torres Straits, and the 2012 television comedy Micro Nation. He has had guest starring roles on Love Child, The Tomorrow People and The Leftovers. 

In 2014, he starred in and composed the music for the short film Manny Gets Censored, narrated by Hugo Weaving. 

In 2016 and 2017, he had roles in Pirates of the Caribbean: Dead Men Tell No Tales, Hacksaw Ridge, and Battle of the Sexes.

From 2017-2019, he played the role of Steven Carrington on The CW's Dynasty reboot.

In 2021, he was cast in the film The Girl at the Window. In 2022, it was announced that he had joined the cast of the mini-series Savage River, co-starring with Katherine Langford. The project reunites him with The Dressmaker director Jocelyn Moorhouse.

Awards
In June 2013 Mackay was the recipient of the fifth annual Australians in Film Heath Ledger Scholarship.

Filmography

Film

Television

Theatre

References

External links 

1984 births
Living people
People educated at Sydney Grammar School
Australian male television actors
21st-century Australian male actors
University of Sydney alumni